Illinois Institute of Technology Academic Campus or IIT Main Campus is one of five campuses of the Illinois Institute of Technology.  It is located in the Douglas community area and has an official address of 3300 South Federal Street and is roughly bounded by 31st Street, State Street, 35th Street and the Dan Ryan Expressway.  Its Main Building and Machinery Hall were designated a Chicago Landmark on May 26, 2004.  The entire Academic Campus was designated as a National Register of Historic Places listing on August 12, 2005.

Machinery Hall (built in 1901) and the Main Building (built between 1891–1893) are located across the street from each other at 33rd and Federal Streets northeast of the location of the former Comiskey Park. The buildings are both Victorian era red brick and granite structures built in the Romanesque revival architecture style that were designed by Patton & Fisher and their successor firm, Patton, Fisher & Miller.  The buildings were constructed with the aid of philanthropy by Philip D. Armour, Sr.  On the first landing of  The Main Building's main staircase there is a stained-glass window dedicated to Philip D. Armour, Jr., located on the first landing.  The two buildings are located adjacent to the  Dan Ryan Expressway and Chicago Transit Authority red line from which they are highly visible.  The original cost of the Main Building (3300 South Federal Street) in 1892 was $500,000 ($ million today), and Machinery Hall (100 West 33rd Street) cost $150,000 ($ million) in 1901.

References

Illinois Institute of Technology
Historic districts in Chicago
South Side, Chicago
School buildings on the National Register of Historic Places in Chicago
Chicago Landmarks
Historic districts on the National Register of Historic Places in Illinois